"Don't Leave Me This Way" is a song written by Kenneth Gamble, Leon Huff and Cary Gilbert. It was originally released in 1975 by Harold Melvin & the Blue Notes featuring Teddy Pendergrass, an act signed to Gamble & Huff's Philadelphia International label. "Don't Leave Me This Way" was subsequently covered by American singer Thelma Houston in 1976 and British duo the Communards in 1986, with both versions achieving commercial success.

Harold Melvin & the Blue Notes original version

The Blue Notes' original version of the song, featuring Teddy Pendergrass's lead vocals, was included on the group's 1975 album Wake Up Everybody. Though not issued as a single in the United States at the time, the Blue Notes' recording reached number three on the US Billboard Hot Disco Singles chart in the wake of Thelma Houston's version. The song proved to be the group's highest-peaking entry in the United Kingdom, reaching number five on the UK Singles Chart, when released there as a single in 1977. It became the title track of a budget LP issued on the CBS Embassy label in the UK in 1978. The track was finally issued as a 12-inch single in the US in 1979, coupled with "Bad Luck".

Charts

Thelma Houston version

"Don't Leave Me This Way" was covered by American singer Thelma Houston in 1976. Originally assigned to Diana Ross, it was intended to be the follow-up to her 1976 single "Love Hangover", but was reassigned to Houston instead.

Following the release of Houston's fourth studio album, Any Way You Like It (1976), a Boston DJ record pool unanimously reported positive audience response to "Don't Leave Me This Way" in discothèques, and the song was selected for release as a single. Houston's version topped the US soul singles chart and, nine weeks later, the Billboard Hot 100 for one week in April 1977. The song peaked at number 13 in the UK. The song peaked at number one on the disco chart. Later in the year, it was featured on the soundtrack to the film Looking for Mr. Goodbar. In 1978, "Don't Leave Me This Way" won the award for Best R&B Vocal Performance, Female at the 20th Annual Grammy Awards.

Houston's version was revived in 1995 in several remixes, which reached number 19 on the US Billboard dance chart and number 35 in the UK. This version got Houston ranked number 86 on VH1's 100 Greatest One-Hit Wonders, as well as the number-two spot on their 100 Greatest Dance Songs list. In 2021, Rolling Stone included "Don't Leave Me This Way" in their list of 500 Best Songs of All Time at No. 355, while in 2022, the magazine ranked it No. 121 in their 200 Greatest Dance Songs of All Time.

HIV/AIDS significance
Throughout the 1980s and 1990s, Houston's version of the song became an unofficial theme song for the AIDS epidemic in gay male communities of the west. American artist Nayland Blake created a work for the American Foundation of Aids Research about the epidemic that referenced the song and its significance in the community. An art exhibition at the National Gallery of Australia entitled "Don't Leave Me This Way – Art in the age of AIDS" opened in 1994 containing various works about the epidemic. A 246-page publication of the exhibition also followed.

Charts

Weekly charts

Year-end charts

The Communards version

In 1986, the song was covered by British duo the Communards (Jimmy Somerville and Richard Coles)  in a hi-NRG version. This recording topped the UK Singles Chart for four weeks in September 1986, becoming the best-selling single of the year in the United Kingdom. The featured guest vocalist was the female jazz singer Sarah Jane Morris. The song reached number 40 on the US Billboard Hot 100 and topped the Billboard dance chart. In 2015, the song was voted by the British public as the nation's 16th favorite 1980s number one in a poll for ITV.

The song also had a music video, which showed the band performing in an underground setting with many fans. This included a blond stoic young man as part of the crowd simply watching. In the video, it turns out that he was chased down and caught and forced to be an informant to secret police. Near the end of the video, he finally radios in to them, and at the end they turn spotlights on the band and the crowd, forcing them to scatter.

Several remixes were issued, notably the "Gotham City Mix" which was split across two sides of a 12-inch single and ran for a total of 22 minutes 55 seconds.

The album liner notes dedicate the song to the Greater London Council (GLC), which had recently been abolished.

Charts

Weekly charts

Year-end charts

Sales and certifications

References

Bibliography
 

1975 songs
1976 singles
1977 singles
1986 singles
Billboard Hot 100 number-one singles
The Communards songs
Disco songs
Dutch Top 40 number-one singles
Harold Melvin & the Blue Notes songs
Hi-NRG songs
Irish Singles Chart number-one singles
London Records singles
Motown singles
Number-one singles in South Africa
Philadelphia International Records singles
Song recordings produced by Hal Davis
Songs written by Kenny Gamble
Songs written by Leon Huff
Thelma Houston songs
UK Singles Chart number-one singles
Ultratop 50 Singles (Flanders) number-one singles
Ultratop 50 Singles (Wallonia) number-one singles
Songs with lyrics by Cary Gilbert